The Presbyterian Church in Korea (GaeHyukHapDong II) is a Reformed denomination in South Korea. In 2004 it had 13,272 members in 125 congregations and 171 ordained ministers. It adheres to the Apostles Creed and Westminster Confession.

References 

Presbyterian denominations in South Korea
Presbyterian denominations in Asia